Psychotria woytkowskii is a species of plant in the family Rubiaceae. It is endemic to Peru.

References

Flora of Peru
woytkowskii
Vulnerable plants
Taxonomy articles created by Polbot